Buinsk is the name of several inhabited localities in Russia.

Urban localities
Buinsk, Republic of Tatarstan, a town of republic significance in the Republic of Tatarstan
Buinsk, Ibresinsky District, Chuvash Republic, an urban-type settlement in Buinskoye Rural Settlement of Ibresinsky District of the Chuvash Republic

Rural localities
Buinsk, Urmarsky District, Chuvash Republic, a village in Kovalinskoye Rural Settlement of Urmarsky District of the Chuvash Republic